Kjell Arne Evald Nordström (born 1949) is a Swedish politician and former member of the Riksdag, the national legislature. A member of the Social Democratic Party, he represented Skaraborg County between September 1985 and September 1991 and Västra Götaland County East between April 1994 and October 2006.

References

1949 births
Living people
Members of the Riksdag 1985–1988
Members of the Riksdag 1988–1991
Members of the Riksdag 1991–1994
Members of the Riksdag 1994–1998
Members of the Riksdag 1998–2002
Members of the Riksdag 2002–2006
Members of the Riksdag from the Social Democrats